"New Kid in Town" is a song by the Eagles from their 1976 studio album Hotel California. It was written by Don Henley, Glenn Frey and J.D. Souther. Released as the first single from the album, the song reached number one in the U.S. and number 20 in the UK. The single version has an earlier fade-out than the album version. Glenn Frey sings the lead vocals, Don Henley sings the main harmony vocals. Randy Meisner plays the guitarrón mexicano, Don Felder plays electric guitars, and Joe Walsh plays the electric piano and organ parts. The song won the Grammy Award for Best Vocal Arrangement for Two or More Voices.

Background
J.D. Souther initially wrote the chorus for the song. According to Souther, the band thought it sounded like a hit, but he did not know what to do with it. About a year later, Souther, Frey and Henley gathered for the writing of Hotel California where Souther played the song for them, and the three  finished the song.

Souther later said that the song came about as a result of their "fascination with gunfire as an analogy" and added that "at some point some kid would come riding into town that was much faster than you and he'd say so, and then he'd prove it." He said: "We were just writing about our replacements." Similarly, Henley discussed the song's meaning in the liner notes of The Very Best Of:

Eagles' biographer Marc Eliot stated that "New Kid in Town" captures "a precise and spectacular moment immediately familiar to any guy who's ever felt the pain, jealousy, insecurity, rage and heartbreak of the moment he discovers his girlfriend likes someone better and has moved on." He also suggests that it captures a more abstract theme of "the fickle nature of both the muse and the masses."

On Henley's first solo album, I Can't Stand Still, he references the song by singing the line "there's a new kid in town" over the rideout of "Johnny Can't Read".

Critical reception
Cash Box said that "Bill Szymczyk’s production brings out the delicacy of the vocal harmonies, and the lyric here is quite effective."  In 2016, the editors of Rolling Stone rated "New Kid in Town" as the fifth greatest Eagles song, describing it as "an exquisite piece of south-of-the-border melancholia" and praising its complex, "overlapping harmonies." These harmonies helped the song win the Grammy Award for Best Vocal Arrangement for Two or More Voices.

Personnel 
Partial credits from liner notes.

 Glenn Frey – lead vocals, acoustic guitar
 Joe Walsh – Fender Rhodes electric piano, Hammond organ, backing vocals
 Don Felder – lead guitars, backing vocals
 Randy Meisner – bass, guitarrón mexicano, backing vocals
 Don Henley – drums, percussion, harmony and backing vocals

Charts

Weekly charts

Year-end charts

References

External links
 

1976 singles
1976 songs
Billboard Hot 100 number-one singles
Eagles (band) songs
Trisha Yearwood songs
Songs written by J. D. Souther
Songs written by Glenn Frey
Songs written by Don Henley
RPM Top Singles number-one singles
Asylum Records singles
Song recordings produced by Bill Szymczyk
Grammy Award for Best Vocal Arrangement for Two or More Voices